Abramtsevo is a rural locality (a selo) in Sinkovskoye Rural Settlement of Dmitrovsky District, Moscow Oblast, Russia. The population was 51 as of 2010.

Geography 
Abramtsevo is located 21 km northwest of Dmitrov (the district's administrative centre) by road. Bunyatino is the nearest rural locality.

References 

Rural localities in Dmitrovsky District, Moscow Oblast